Patrick John McCartan (born 5 May 1953) is an Irish lawyer who was a Circuit Court judge and a former politician.

A native of Wexford, he first practiced as a solicitor working in criminal defence. He was first elected to Dáil Éireann as a Workers' Party Teachta Dála (TD) for the Dublin North-East constituency at the 1987 general election. He was re-elected at the 1989 general election.

In 1992 he joined with Proinsias De Rossa and five other Workers' Party deputies in resigning from the Workers' Party and in the creation of a new party, New Agenda which subsequently became Democratic Left. He stood as a Democratic Left candidate at the 1992 general election but lost his seat. After the collapse of the 1992–1994 Fianna Fáil–Labour Party coalition government Democratic Left joined in a new coalition with Fine Gael and the Labour Party. This government subsequently appointed McCartan to the bench as a Circuit Court judge.

He retired as a judge in August 2016.

References

1953 births
Living people
Local councillors in Dublin (city)
Democratic Left (Ireland) TDs
Circuit Court (Ireland) judges
Members of the 25th Dáil
Members of the 26th Dáil
People from County Wexford
Workers' Party (Ireland) TDs
Irish solicitors